Dean St Hilaire (born 15 August 1963) is a Trinidadian cricketer. He played in five first-class and two List A matches for Trinidad and Tobago from 1983 to 1989.

See also
 List of Trinidadian representative cricketers

References

External links
 

1963 births
Living people
Trinidad and Tobago cricketers